Austria is a federal republic made up of nine states (German: Länder). Since Land is also the German word for "country", the term Bundesländer (literally federal states) is often used instead to avoid ambiguity. The Constitution of Austria uses both terms. Austrian states can pass laws that stay within the limits of the constitution, and each state has representatives in the main Austrian parliament.

Geography

The majority of the land area in the states of Upper Austria, Lower Austria, Vienna, and Burgenland is situated in the Danube valley and thus consists almost completely of accessible and easily arable terrain. The other five states, in contrast, are located in the Alps and thus are comparatively unsuitable for agriculture. Their terrain is also relatively unfavourable to heavy industry and long-distance trade. Accordingly, the population of what now is the Republic of Austria has been concentrated in the former four states since prehistoric times. Austria's most densely populated state is the city-state of Vienna, the heart of what is Austria's only metropolitan area. Lower Austria ranks only fourth in population density even though it contains Vienna's suburbs; this is due to large areas of land being predominantly agricultural. The alpine state of Tyrol, the less alpine but geographically more remote state of Carinthia, and the non-alpine but near-exclusively agricultural state of Burgenland are Austria's least densely populated states. The wealthy alpine state of Vorarlberg is something of an anomaly due to its small size, isolated location and distinct Alemannic culture.

Federalism and state powers
Each Austrian state has an elected legislature, the Landtag, and a state government (Landesregierung) headed by a governor (Landeshauptmann or Landeshauptfrau). Elections are held every five years (six years in Upper Austria). The state constitution, among other things, determines how the seats in the state government are assigned to political parties, with most states having a system of proportional representation based on the number of delegates in the Landtag in place. The Landeshauptmann is elected by the Landtag, though in practice the governor is the leader of the majority party or coalition in the Landtag.

Vienna, the capital of Austria, plays a double role as city and "Bundesland." The mayor has the rank of a state governor, while the city council also functions as a Landtag. Under the municipal constitution, however, city and state business must be kept separate.  Hence, while the city council and Landtag have identical memberships, they hold separate meetings, and each body has separate presiding officers. When meeting as a city council, the deputies can only deal with city affairs; when meeting as a Landtag, they can only deal with state affairs.

Austrian federalism is largely theoretical as the states are granted few legislative powers. The federal constitution initially granted all legislative powers to the states, but many powers have been subsequently taken away, and only a few remain, such as planning and zoning codes, nature protection, hunting, fishing, farming, youth protection, certain issues of public health and welfare and the right to levy certain taxes.

All other matters, including but not limited to criminal law, civil law, corporate law, most aspects of economic law, defense, most educational matters and academia, telecommunications, and much of the healthcare system are regulated by federal laws. There is also no judiciary of the Länder, since the federal constitution defines the judiciary as an exclusively federal matter. This centralisation follows a historic model where central power during the time of the empire was largely concentrated in Vienna.

However, the state governor (Landeshauptmann) is in charge of the administration of much of federal administrative law within the respective state, which makes this post an important political position. Furthermore, state competences include zoning laws, planning issues and public procurement on the regional level, which adds considerable weight to state politics. As a practical matter, there have been cases where states have been able to block projects endorsed by the federal government, as in the case of a railway tunnel that was to be built below the Semmering.

Austrian Länder are endowed formally and practically with a much smaller degree of autonomy than American or German states. Even so, Austrians tend to identify passionately with their respective Land and often defend what little independent governance their states have. It is not unheard of for Austrians to consider themselves, for instance, Tyrolean first, Austrian second.

Historical development
In terms of boundaries, the present-day states arose from the crown lands of Austria-Hungary, an extensive multiethnic realm whose German-speaking nucleus emerged as the Republic of Austria after the dissolution of the Dual Monarchy in the end of World War I.

The states of Upper Austria and Lower Austria are essentially equivalent to what were the two halves of the Archduchy of Austria, a principality which formed the empire's historic heartland. Salzburg is coterminous with the former Austro-Hungarian Duchy of Salzburg (the former Archbishopric). Similarly, the state of Carinthia descends from the Duchy of Carinthia, the state of Styria descends from the Duchy of Styria, and the state of Tyrol descends from the Princely County of Tyrol; these states had to cede territories to Czechoslovakia, Italy, and Yugoslavia when Austria emerged in its present form. The state of Vorarlberg is made up of territories acquired by the House of Habsburg in the 14th and 15th centuries, and was a semi-autonomous part of the County of Tyrol from 1861.

The 1815 Congress of Vienna saw most of these areas lose their autonomy. Provincial charters were put in place in 1861, although power remained with the central government. Following the First World War, the state governments declared themselves part of the Republic of German-Austria. Negotiations at this time between the state governments and the national governments resulted in the agreement to form a federation, with a nationally elected lower house and an upper house representing the states.

The city-state of Vienna was a part of Lower Austria up until 1921. The state of Burgenland is made up of the predominantly German-speaking area that the Kingdom of Hungary until 1921 had to cede to the First Austrian Republic after World War I as a result of the Treaties of Trianon and Saint-Germain-en-Laye.

List of States
The nine states (Bundesländer) of Austria are:

For the purpose of the above list, a city is a community defined to be a city by Austrian law; a town is a community not defined to be a city. Many of Austria's cities have population figures on the order of ten thousand inhabitants; some are even smaller.

See also
Distribution of seats in the Austrian Landtage
Districts of Austria
Flags of Austrian states
Coats of arms of the Austrian states
ISO 3166-2:AT
List of Austrian states by GDP
List of Austrian states by Human Development Index

References

 
Subdivisions of Austria
Austria, States
Austria 1
States, Austria
Austria geography-related lists